Paixia Station is a metro station of Line 1 of the Fuzhou Metro. It is located on the south of the intersection of Fuxia Road and South 3rd-Ring Road in Cangshan District, Fuzhou, Fujian, China. It started operation on May 18, 2016.

Station layout

Exits

References 

Railway stations in China opened in 2016
Fuzhou Metro stations